James Riley Breckenridge (born January 5, 1975) is the drummer for the band Thrice. He plays Q Drums, and uses Vic Firth drumsticks, Zildjian cymbals, Remo drumheads, with Drum Workshop hardware and pedals.

Biography
The older brother of Thrice bassist Eddie Breckenridge, Riley joined Thrice during the early days of the band on the recommendation of Eddie. He is also the co-host of the baseball and music podcast, The PRODcast.

Personal life

Breckenridge, along with Morningwood lead singer Chantal Claret, wrote a monthly advice column called "Battle of the Sexes" in Alternative Press magazine for nearly 3 years; which was discontinued in the Winter of 2007.

Breckenridge originally had aspirations of becoming a professional baseball player. He played two years as a walk-on at Pepperdine before his athletic career was unexpectedly cut short due to injuries he sustained playing football.

On August 18, 2015 Jennifer Shaw, wife of Breckenridge, gave birth to their first child, Jacob Miles Breckenridge.

Equipment
During the 2011 Major/Minor Fall Headline Tour, Brecker used a drum kit by Q Drums, with Zildjian cymbals, Remo heads, DW hardware, and Vic Firth sticks. He plays electronic sounds on a Roland SPD-SX sampling pad.

References

Thrice website
Water is Poison, a Thrice fan site
IdiomLife.com interview with Riley Breckenridge
LiveDaily interview with Riley Breckenridge

1975 births
Living people
American rock drummers
Thrice members
20th-century American drummers
American male drummers
21st-century American drummers